The third HMS Windsor (D42)  was a W-class destroyer of the British Royal Navy that saw service in the final months of World War I and in World War II.

Construction and commissioning
Windsor was ordered on 9 December 1916, and was laid down by Scotts Shipbuilding and Engineering Company at Greenock, Scotland, in April 1917. Launched on 21 June 1918, she was completed on 28 August 1918 and commissioned the same day. She was assigned the pennant number F12 in September 1918; it was changed to D42 during the interwar period.

Service history

World War I
Upon completion, Windsor was assigned to the Grand Fleet, based at Scapa Flow in the Orkney Islands, in which she served for the rest of World War I. She was present at the surrender of the Imperial German Navy's High Seas Fleet in November 1918.

Interwar
Windsor was assigned to the 6th Destroyer Flotilla in the Atlantic Fleet in 1921. In 1928, she was part of the Portsmouth Local Flotilla.

World War II

1939–1940
On the day the United Kingdom entered World War II, 3 September 1939, Windsor was assigned to the 18th Destroyer Flotilla at Portland, England, for convoy escort and patrol duty in the English Channel and Southwestern Approaches. In October 1939 she transferred to Western Approaches Command but continued her assignment in the Southwestern Approaches. By January 1940, she was based at Plymouth for these duties. On 11 March 1940, she and the destroyer  relieved two French warships as the escort of Convoy HG 21, as it arrived in the Southwestern Approaches from Gibraltar, and escorted the convoy until the conclusion of its voyage at Liverpool on 13 March 1940.

In May 1940, Windsor transferred to the 19th Destroyer Flotilla at Dover and was assigned to the support of military operations opposing the highly successful German offensive into France, Belgium, the Netherlands, and Luxembourg that began that month. On the evening of 13 May 1940, she evacuated the Government of the Netherlands from the Hook of Holland. On 23 May 1940, she and the destroyer  patrolled off Boulogne, France, and engaged troops and tanks of the German Armys 2nd Panzer Division that were attacking the port; Windsor entered the port that evening and evacuated British troops trapped there by the German advance.

On 26 May 1940, Windsor was assigned to Operation Dynamo, the evacuation of Allied troops from Dunkirk, France. She began support operations on 27 May 1940, patrolling off the Dunkirk beachhead and escorting ships engaged in evacuating personnel from it. That day she came to the assistance of the passenger ship Mona's Isle, which had come under German air attack with 1,000 troops from Dunkirk on board, suffering 23 dead and 60 wounded; after rendering medical assistance to Mona's Isle, then Windsor escorted her to Dover. On 28 May, Windsor herself came under a heavy and sustained attack by 15 German aircraft, which bombed and strafed her, inflicting 30 casualties on her crew and causing significant damage, forcing her to return to Dover. Despite her damage, however, she remained in action, evacuating 606 troops from Dunkirk on 30 May 658 troops on one trip and 588 troops on a second trip on 31 May 493 troops on 1 June, and 644 troops in two voyages on 2 June. She made her final evacuation trip on 3 June, transporting 1,022 troops and bringing to 3,991 the number of troops she had evacuated from Dunkirk.

Windsor proceeded to Liverpool on 4 June 1940 for repairs and a refit, and her pennant number was changed to I42.

On 28 October 1940, Windsor towed Walpole to Sheerness after Walpole detonated a magnetic mine and became disabled. On 8 December 1940, Windsor herself struck a naval mine off Aldeburgh, Suffolk, and she entered Chatham Dockyard for repairs.

1941–1942
Windsors repairs were completed on 24 April 1941. In May 1941, she detached from her North Sea duties for service with the Home Fleet at Scapa Flow in the Orkney Islands. During her time with the Home Fleet, she escorted major warships during exercises in the Northwestern Approaches; on 17 May 1941, she and Walpole escorted the battleship  during a gunnery exercise.

Windsor returned to the 16th Destroyer Flotilla at Harwich in July 1941 and resumed her North Sea convoy and patrol duties. By January 1942, these duties had begun to include operations to intercept German motor torpedo boats – S-boats, known to the Allies as "E-boats" – in the North Sea before they could mount attacks against Allied ships. She then returned to convoy and patrol duty in the North Sea and English Channel.

In August 1942, Windsor, Montrose, Walpole, and the destroyer  detached for duty with the Home Fleet at Scapa Flow and deployed in the Northwestern Approaches to escort major warships of the Home Fleet and conduct antisubmarine patrols. In September 1942, Windsor was assigned to support the passage of the Arctic convoys PQ 18 and QP 14 during their voyages to and from the Soviet Union, respectively. Force P proceeded to Lowe Sound at Spitsbergen to establish a refuelling base. Windsor operated as a guard ship there from 12 September until 21 September 1942, when refuelling operations were complete and she departed for Iceland. On 26 September, she departed Iceland to return to her North Sea convoy and patrol duties with the 16th Destroyer Flotilla.

After spending the autumn of 1942 in North Sea operations, Windsor again detached in December 1942 for a tour of duty with the Home Fleet at Scapa Flow.

During 1942, the Urban District of Windsor in Berkshire "adopted" Windsor as the result of a Warship Week National Savings campaign.

1943–1945
In January 1943, Windsor continued her deployment with the Home Fleet, operating in the Northwestern Approaches. Later in the month, she returned to her North Sea duties with the 16th Destroyer Flotilla, and on 24 January 1943 she and the escort destroyer  drove off a German E-boat attack against a convoy they were escorting in the North Sea. On 4 March 1943, Windsor, the escort destroyer , and the corvette  fought an action against E-boats off Great Yarmouth.

Windsor continued her escort and patrol operations in the North Sea until May 1944, when the Royal Navy assigned her to support of the upcoming Allied invasion of Normandy, scheduled for early June 1944. Accordingly, she joined the corvette  and two motor launches of the Royal Navy Coastal Forces off Southend in early June 1944 to form Escort Group 132, assigned to escort Convoy ETC2Y, which consisted of 13 coasters carrying pre-loaded British transports as well as five water tankers and 10 oil tankers. On 4 June 1944, the convoy and its escorts moved from the Thames Estuary to the Solent, where the corvette  and a motor minesweeper joined the escort. The invasion was postponed from 5 to 6 June 1944 due to bad weather, but on 7 June, the day after the initial landings, the convoy arrived off the invasion beaches to discharge its cargo, then returned to the Nore later in the day to begin a convoying cycle supporting the build-up of Allied forces and supplies in Normandy. From 8 June until later in the month, Windsor escorted convoys between England and the beachhead.

In July 1944, Windsor returned to patrol and escort duty in the North Sea, which she continued until the surrender of Germany in early May 1945.

Decommissioning and disposal
During the summer of 1945, Windsor was decommissioned, transferred to the Reserve Fleet, and placed in reserve, no longer being listed on the Royal Navys active list by July 1945. After the surrender of Japan on 15 August 1945, Windsor was placed on the disposal list. She was sold on 4 March 1947 to Metal Industries for scrapping, arrived under tow at the shipbreakers yard in Charlestown, Fife, Scotland, in May 1949, and was scrapped in June 1949.

Notes

Bibliography
 
 
 
 
 
 
 
 
 
 
 
 
 
 

 

V and W-class destroyers of the Royal Navy
Ships built on the River Clyde
1918 ships
World War I destroyers of the United Kingdom
World War II destroyers of the United Kingdom